Kaew Tah Pee (is a Thai "lakorn," or televised soap drama, which aired in 2006.

Cast

Chisanu Naresuan- "Tik" Jesdaporn Pholdee
Nathlada - "Cherry" Khemupsorn Sirisukha
Lizzy Lerlaksami - "Aom" Sakawjai Poonsawas
Pruk - "Ace" Worarit Vaijiaranai
Amitada - "Jaja" Primrata Dejudom
Amaj - "Gaw" Jirayu Laongmanee

Synopsis

Three years after a car accident left him blind, the millionaire Chisanu Naresuan moves to the countryside to relax. There, he meets Nathlada, a young kindergarten teacher, when he bumps into her and nearly knocks her off a bridge. She is grateful to him for saving her life: She was going to kill herself, but he pulled her up and inadvertently talked her out of it. A friendship formed. Nathlada, or "Lada" as she preferred to be called, believed "Chit" to be a poor fisherman. Her ex-boyfriend, who was married to another woman but lied to Nathlada that he was unwed, stalks her to the countryside. 

Chisanu gets a phone call that the doctors have found a cornea that might fit him, so he must go to France for surgery. He tricks Nathlada into marrying him; they go to his main estate in Thailand and then to France. Chisanu's ex-girlfriend (who is now married) and his lawyer's daughter do their best to break him and Nathlada apart. P'Thep (Lada's ex-boyfriend) continuously stalks her. There is a lot of misunderstanding and poor communication: trouble abounds.

Reception

Kaew Tah Pee was well accepted during it first airing in Thailand. It has proved to be one of the most beloved lakorns amongst international fans and was one of the first to be translated to, and subbed in, English. 80% of the series was filmed in France. The cast was said to have stayed in France for about two weeks to exhaustively complete all the shoots. The fairy-tale storyline, chemistry between the two attractive leads and with beautiful locations and views filmed in France have combined to make it a great success outside Thailand.

Channel 3 (Thailand) original programming
2006 Thai television series debuts
2006 Thai television series endings
Thai television soap operas
2000s Thai television series
Television shows set in France